Mark Egan (born January 14, 1951 in Brockton, Massachusetts) is an American jazz bassist and trumpeter known for his membership in the Pat Metheny Group and the Gil Evans Orchestra. He is co-founder of the jazz fusion band, Elements.

Biography
Mark McDanel Egan was born in Brockton in 1951. Influenced by his father he studied trumpet at age 10. He played the trumpet throughout high school, and began playing the bass when he was 15. While attending the University of Miami's Frost School of Music initially as a trumpet student, he studied with jazz educator Jerry Coker. He switched from playing trumpet to bass part way through the program. While in Miami he also became friends and performed with Ira Sullivan, Pat Metheny, Danny Gottlieb, and Clifford Carter. His teachers included Jaco Pastorius, Dave Holland, and Andy LaVerne.

In 1975, after graduate school, Egan went on tour with Eumir Deodato and the Pointer Sisters and recorded with David Sanborn. Two years later he worked as a studio musician in New York City, where he met Joe Beck and Steve Khan. He was part of the Pat Metheny Group until 1981; then he and the group's drummer, Danny Gottlieb, started the jazz fusion band Elements. They were joined by Bill Evans on saxophone and Clifford Carter on keyboards. Elements recorded and toured through the 1990s. During the 1980s and 1990s, Egan was also part of the Gil Evans Orchestra. He founded his own record label, Wavetone Records.

Egan has made three music videos: Om Yoga & Meditation, Music on the Edge, and Bass Workshop. He has appeared on the soundtracks of movies including Two Moon Junction, The Object of My Affection, You've Got Mail, The Color of Money, Rollover, Quick Change, Blown Away, and A Chorus Line. He recorded an album, Urge, with trumpeter Forrest Buchtel, Jr., featuring among other things, the theme from CNN Headline News.

Egan has toured and recorded with a vast range of artists including Gil Evans, Pat Metheny, Stan Getz, Sting, Arcadia, Roger Daltrey, Joan Osborne,  Marianne Faithfull, Michael Franks, Carly Simon, Art Garfunkel, John McLaughlin, Larry Coryell, Pat Martino, Judy Collins, Sophie B. Hawkins, Bill Evans, Lew Soloff, Bryan Ferry, Joe Beck, Jim Hall, Airto Moreira, Flora Purim, Toninho Horta, Paul Shaffer, and The Pointer Sisters.

Discography

As leader
 1985 Mosaic (Hip Pocket)
 1988 A Touch of Light (GRP)
 1992 Beyond Words (Mesa/Bluemoon)
 2001 Freedom Town (Wavetone)
 2006 As We Speak (Wavetone)
 2007 Live...in the Moment (Tripping Tree)
 2008 Tell Me a Bed Time Story: The Big Apple (Universal Distribution)
 2010 Truth Be Told (Wavetone)
 2013 Unit 1 (Wavetone)
 2014 About Now (Wavetone)
 2015 Direction Home (Wavetone)
 2017 "Dreaming Spirits" Mark Egan and Arjun Bruggeman featuring Shane Theriot (Wavetone)
2020 "Electric Blue " with Danny Gottlieb (Wavetone)

With Elements
Elements
Elements Forward Motion
Illumination
Liberal Arts
Spirit River
Blown Away
Far East Volume 1
Far East Volume 2
Untold Stories
Wouldn't It Be Nice: Tribute to Brian Wilson

With others

References

External links
Mark Egan Official Site - includes complete discography
Wavetone Records site
CD Baby site
Mark Egan at Amazon
Mark Egan songs

1951 births
Living people
Pat Metheny Group members
American jazz bass guitarists
American male bass guitarists
University of Miami Frost School of Music alumni
Musicians from Brockton, Massachusetts
Guitarists from Massachusetts
20th-century American bass guitarists
Jazz musicians from Massachusetts
20th-century American male musicians
American male jazz musicians
Elements (band) members